The second season of the American horror series Chucky, created by Don Mancini, was broadcast simultaneously on Syfy and USA Network between October 5 and November 23, 2022, comprising eight episodes. Based on the Child's Play film franchise, the series serves as a sequel to Cult of Chucky, and stars Brad Dourif reprising his role as the voice of the titular character, alongside Zackary Arthur, Alyvia Alyn Lind, and Björgvin Arnarson in the ensemble cast.

Cast and characters

Main 
 Zackary Arthur as Jake Wheeler
 Björgvin Arnarson as Devon Evans
 Alyvia Alyn Lind as Lexy Cross
 Brad Dourif as the voice of Chucky / Charles Lee Ray
 Jacob Breedon as Chucky (double)
 David Kohlsmith as young Charles Lee Ray (7 years old)
 Tyler Barish as young Charles Lee Ray (14 years old)

Recurring 
 Alex Vincent as Andy Barclay
 Devon Sawa as Father Bryce
 Also portrayed Chucky
 Fiona Dourif as Nica Pierce
 Jennifer Tilly as Tiffany Valentine and herself
 Jacob Breedon as Doll Tiffany (double)
 Bella Higginbotham as Nadine
 Christine Elise as Kyle
 Lachlan Watson as Glen and Glenda Tilly
 Rosemary Dunsmore as Dr. Amanda Mixter
 Sage Kitchen as young Dr. Mixter
 Also portrayed Chucky
 Lara Jean Chorostecki as Sister Ruth
 Andrea Carter as Sister Catherine

Notable guest stars 
 Barbara Alyn Woods as Mayor Michelle Cross
 Carina London Battrick as Caroline Cross
 Gina Gershon as herself
 Liv Morgan as herself
 Joe Pantoliano as himself
 Sutton Stracke as herself
 Meg Tilly as herself
 Billy Boyd as the voice of G.G. Valentine
 Annie M. Briggs as Miss Fairchild

Episodes

Development 
On November 29, 2021, USA Network and Syfy renewed the series for a second season which premiered on October 5, 2022. In June 2022, Lachlan Watson was cast as Glen/Glenda Ray. On January 15, 2023, the series was renewed for a third season.

Reception

Critical response
On Rotten Tomatoes, the second season has an approval rating of 89% based on 9 critics, with an average rating of 7.8/10. Reviewing the first two episodes that were sent to critics, Collider's Alyse Wax said that the show at first "just seems like standard everyday horrors", although being "fun" and "a delight". Slash Film's Jeff Ewing highlighted the way the three main actors (Arthur, Arnarson and Alyn Lind) play off each other's performances, since they are "more convincing together than apart".

Ratings

Syfy

USA Network

References 

2022 American television seasons